The , formerly known as the Nezu Institute of Fine Arts, is an art museum in the Minato district of Tokyo, Japan.

The museum houses the private collection of pre-modern Japanese and East Asian art of Nezu Kaichirō (1860–1940). The museum foundation was established on the death of the founder Nezu in 1940 and exhibitions were first opened to the public in 1941. The museum collection was stored away from central Tokyo during the second world war and escaped the destruction suffered by the estate property in the bombing of May 1945. Exhibitions were restarted after the war in 1946. 

Closed due to large-scale renovation and renewal from 2006 onwards, the museum re-opened in fall 2009 with a completely new museum building by the Japanese architect Kengo Kuma.

Included in the collection are a pair of Edo period folding screens, Irises, by Ogata Kōrin. It also includes other paintings of renown, calligraphy, sculpture, ceramics, textiles and archaeological materials, as well as objects in lacquer, metal, and wood. The collection also consists of Chinese bronzes of the Shang and Zhou dynasties. The Nezu Museum is also known for its extensive, Japanese-style garden.

See also
 List of National Treasures of Japan (paintings)
List of National Treasures of Japan (writings)

References

External links 
 Website (Japanese, English)

Art museums and galleries in Tokyo
Art museums established in 1940
1940 establishments in Japan
Buildings and structures in Japan destroyed during World War II
Buildings and structures in Minato, Tokyo
Kengo Kuma buildings